Crescendo is a gradual increase of loudness in music.

Crescendo may also refer to:

Books
Crescendo, 1958 novel by Phyllis Bentley
Crescendo, 1998 novel by Mary McCarthy
Crescendo, 1928 novel by Henry Bellamann
Crescendo (Fitzpatrick novel), 2010 young adult novel by Becca Fitzpatrick
Crescendo 1980 novel by Charlotte Lamb

Computing
 Crescendo Communications, a computer networking company that was acquired by Cisco in the 1990s
 Crescendo Networks, a company which develops and sells application acceleration devices for data centers
 Crescendo (visual novel), a 2001 bishōjo game by the studio Digital Object

Film
Crescendo (TV series), a Singaporean musical series produced by Wawa Pictures
Crescendo (1970 film), a British horror film directed by Alan Gibson
Crescendo (2019 film), a German drama film directed by Dror Zahavi

Music
The Crescendo (music venue)
 The Crescendos, an early rock and roll group
Crescendo (album), a 1990 album by the Brazilian brock band Ultraje a Rigor
Crescendo (awards), an annual music competition dedicated to Afrikaans music
"Crescendo", a 1990 song by James from the album Gold Mother
"Crescendo", a 2013 song by Little Boots

Other uses
Crescendo (heart murmur), used to characterize and classify heart murmurs
Crescendo, a body shape adapting smart toy by MysteryVibe